The Aerochia LT-1 is a single place, composite construction, homebuilt aircraft.

Design and development

The LT-1 was co-developed by Andy Chiavetta, a composite parts specialist, and air racer, Darryl Greenamyer. The intent was to design a very simple homebuilt aircraft for first-time builders.

The LT-1 is a single seat, low-wing, composite aircraft with tricycle landing gear. The wing uses an elliptical planform.

The first flight was performed in May 2010 piloted by Len Fox.

Specifications (LT-1)

References

Homebuilt aircraft